The Bangui magnetic anomaly is a local variation in the Earth's magnetic field centered at Bangui, the capital of the Central African Republic. The anomaly was discovered in the late 1950s, explored in the 1970s, and named in 1982. Its origin remains unclear.

History
In 1962, Raymond Godivier and Lucien Le Donche reported on a magnetic anomaly in the Central African Republic, which they identified by analyzing their surface magnetic activity data of 1956. These results were confirmed and built upon by the high-altitude aeromagnetic surveys carried out by the US Naval Oceanographic Office, as well as by the satellite measurements conducted in 1964 with Cosmos 49 and in the 1970s with the Orbiting Geophysical Observatory at  altitudes.

In 1982, Robert D. Regan and Bruce D. Marsh named the anomaly after the city located at its center.

The anomaly is sometimes called the Bangui negative anomaly, owing to its negative peak-to-trough difference, and is compared with the positive anomalies observed at the Benue Trough and Congo Basin where Lower Cambrian geological formations are exposed.

Salient features
The Bangui anomaly is bounded to the south by the Walvis Ridge, the north by the Cameroon–St. Helena volcanic line, and to the west by the Mid-Atlantic Ridge. It is shaped approximately as an ellipse  in size. It has three sections, and the magnetic equator runs through its center. Its features include a Bouguer gravity anomaly of −120 mGal, a topographical surface feature shaped as a ring of  diameter, rock features of Late Archean and Proterozoic periods in the central part of the anomaly, granulites, and charnockites rock formations supplemented by granites at the lower crust level, and greenstone belts, and metamorphosed basalts seen as rock exposures. A zone of thinner crust bounds the anomaly to the north and a zone of relatively thicker crust is on the southern edge.

Origin
Two theories have been suggested for the origin of the Bangui anomaly, neither being conclusive. One theory points to a large igneous intrusion and the other to a meteorite impact in the Precambrian (before 540 Ma). To support the latter theory, a connection was drawn with a meteorite impact that may have occurred in Brazil in Bahia state causing formation of carbonados (black diamond aggregates) which are only found in the Central African Republic and Brazil.

See also
Popigai diamonds
Temagami Magnetic Anomaly
Ishpatina Ridge
Kursk Magnetic Anomaly

References

Bangui
Geology of the Central African Republic
Magnetic anomalies
Geology of Africa